Baklanovsky (masculine), Baklanovskaya (feminine), or Baklanovskoye (neuter) is the name of several rural localities in Russia:
Baklanovsky (rural locality), a khutor in Kulikovsky Selsoviet of Novonikolayevsky District of Volgograd Oblast
Baklanovskaya, Rostov Oblast, a stanitsa in Maloluchenskoye Rural Settlement of Dubovsky District of Rostov Oblast
Baklanovskaya, Stavropol Krai, a stanitsa in Izobilnensky District of Stavropol Krai
Baklanovskaya, Markushevsky Selsoviet, Tarnogsky District, Vologda Oblast, a village in Markushevsky Selsoviet of Tarnogsky District of Vologda Oblast
Baklanovskaya, Ozeretsky Selsoviet, Tarnogsky District, Vologda Oblast, a village in Ozeretsky Selsoviet of Tarnogsky District of Vologda Oblast